The Opava is a river in the north-eastern Czech Republic, a left tributary of the Oder river. It originates at the confluence of Bílá (White), Střední (Middle) and Černá (Black) Opava in Vrbno pod Pradědem and runs over 110 km (69 mi) to the Oder at Ostrava, with some 25 km (16 mi) forming the border with Poland. Its basin area is about 2,090 km2, of which 1,814 km2 in the Czech Republic.

After the First Silesian War, by the terms of the Treaty of Breslau in 1742, the Opava in the Duchy of Troppau became the border between Austrian and Prussian Silesia (the later Province of Silesia). After World War I the demarcation was confirmed by the 1919 Treaty of Saint-Germain-en-Laye as the border between Czechoslovakia (Czech Silesia) and the Second Polish Republic.

Towns 
Vrbno pod Pradědem
Krnov
Opava
Kravaře
Ostrava

References 

Rivers of the Moravian-Silesian Region

Rivers of Poland
Moravian-Silesian Region
Rivers of Opole Voivodeship
Czech Republic–Poland border
International rivers of Europe
Border rivers